Peter Godwin (born 4 December 1957) is a Zimbabwean author, journalist, screenwriter, documentary filmmaker, and former human rights lawyer. Best known for his writings concerning the breakdown of his native Zimbabwe, he has reported from more than 60 countries and written several books. He served as president of PEN American Center from 2012 to 2015 and resides in Manhattan, New York.

Early life and education
His mother was of English descent and was a former hospital doctor. His father was an engineer and is of Polish Jewish ancestry. His father's immediate family were killed in The Holocaust. 

Godwin grew up with his family in Rhodesia, where he attended St. George's College. He was conscripted into the British South Africa Police at the age of seventeen to fight in the Rhodesian Bush War. In 1978, his older sister Jain and her fiancé were killed when their car was ambushed by insurgents. 

Another sister, Georgina Godwin, has worked as a journalist, broadcast presenter and podcaster, in both Zimbabwe (until 2001) and the UK.

Peter Godwin studied law at Cambridge University and international relations at Oxford University.

Career

Early career
Godwin was formerly a foreign correspondent for The Sunday Times (London), covering wars in Angola, Mozambique, Namibia, and Zimbabwe. Later he was the chief correspondent for the BBC's foreign affairs program, directing documentaries on Cuba, Czechoslovakia, and the Balkans.

His early books include Rhodesians Never Die: The Impact of War and Political Change on White Rhodesia c1970 – 1980, co-written with Ian Hancock; The Three of Us, co-written with Joanna Coles; and Wild at Heart: Man and Beast in Southern Africa, with photographs by Chris Johns.

Journalism
Godwin is a contributor to The New York Times, and Vanity Fair, among other publications. In 2008 he wrote in the Times about the small islands of Likoma and Chizumulu on Lake Malawi, which are lacustrine exclaves of Malawi located in Mozambican territorial waters. He has also reviewed books for the New York Times Book Review.

In 2007, he called for the international community to "make it clear" to South African president Thabo Mbeki "that he, and the new South Africa, have a special moral obligation to help a nearby people who are oppressed and disenfranchised, having been assisted in its own struggle by just such pressure." In 2008, Godwin suggested in The New York Times that the withdrawal of participating countries from the 2010 World Cup in South Africa might persuade Mbeki to use his country's economic power to draw Mugabe's rule in Zimbabwe "to an end in weeks rather than months."

Other professional activities
In 2012, Godwin was named President of PEN American Center, the largest branch of the world's oldest literary and human rights organisation. On 20 March 2012, Peter Godwin, as the incoming President of PEN American Center, read poetry by the imprisoned, Liu Xiaobo, with outgoing PEN President, Kwame Anthony Appiah.

Godwin is a member of the Council on Foreign Relations. He has been a Guggenheim Fellow, an Orwell Fellow, and a MacDowell Fellow, and has also taught writing at the New School, Princeton University, and Columbia University.

Books and documentaries

Industry of Death
Godwin's film The Industry of Death (1993) was an investigation of Thailand's sex industry.

Mukiwa
In 1997, Godwin published Mukiwa: A White Boy in Africa. A memoir about growing up in Southern Rhodesia in the 1960s and 1970s during the Rhodesian Bush War, it was described by the Boston Globe as "devastatingly brilliant" and "[o]ne of the best memoirs to come out of Africa." The book won The Orwell Prize in 1997.

When a Crocodile Eats the Sun
In 2006, his second memoir, When a Crocodile Eats the Sun, was published. It details the ebbing of his father's life, set to the backdrop of modern-day Zimbabwe, and his discovery of his father's Polish Jewish roots.

The Fear
Godwin's book, The Fear: Robert Mugabe and the Martyrdom of Zimbabwe (2011), chronicles the systematic campaign of murder and torture unleashed by Zimbabwe's autocratic ruler following his defeat at the polls. Godwin was interviewed by Terry Gross on Fresh Air (NPR) in March 2011 about the situation in Zimbabwe since the 2008 general election.

The Fear was selected as a best book of 2011 by The New Yorker, The Economist, and Publishers Weekly.

Personal life
Godwin was married to Joanna Coles, living together in the Upper West Side of Manhattan with their sons, Thomas and Hugo, who as of November 2019 were aged 20 and 18 respectively, and with a dog, Phoebe. His daughter, Holly, who was 25 years old as of November 2019, is based in the UK. In July 2019, Coles filed for divorce from Godwin.

References

External links

1957 births
Living people
Alumni of St. George's College, Harare
Alumni of the University of Oxford
Alumni of the University of Cambridge
British South Africa Police officers
People from Harare
Rhodesian memoirists
Rhodesian military personnel of the Bush War
Rhodesian writers
Zimbabwean emigrants to the United States
Zimbabwean exiles
Zimbabwean journalists
Zimbabwean memoirists
Zimbabwean people of British descent
Zimbabwean people of Polish-Jewish descent
Writers about Africa
21st-century Zimbabwean writers
20th-century Zimbabwean writers